New Hampshire elected its members August 25, 1806.

See also 
 United States House of Representatives elections, 1806 and 1807
 List of United States representatives from New Hampshire

Notes 

1806
New Hampshire
United States House of Representatives